Vukkala Rajeswaramma (born 10 July 1948) is an Indian politician and a Member of Parliament elected from the Nellore constituency in the Indian state of Andhra Pradesh being a Telugu Desam Party candidate.

Early life and education
Rajeswaramma was on born on 10 July 1948 in Atmakur in Nellore district in the Indian state of Andhra Pradesh. She is a graduate of Kurnool Medical College, Kurnool in M.B.B.S. She married V. Prakash Rao on 14 Jan 1970 and she has two sons.

Career
In 1999, Rajeswaramma was elected a Member of Parliament to 13th Lok Sabha. She served as a member of Committee on Science and Technology, Environment and Forests from 1999-2000 and 2000–2004, as a member of Consultative Committee, Ministry of Human Resource Development.

References

Articles created or expanded during Women's History Month (India) - 2014
1948 births
Living people
Telugu Desam Party politicians
People from Nellore
Women in Andhra Pradesh politics
20th-century Indian women politicians
20th-century Indian politicians
21st-century Indian women politicians
21st-century Indian politicians
India MPs 1999–2004
Lok Sabha members from Andhra Pradesh